James Thomson (J.T.) Picken was a Scottish-Australian businessman.

Picken was born in Glasgow, Scotland. He later emigrated to Australia and settled in Melbourne. He was the chairman and founder of the privately owned J.T. Picken Ltd Printers which, after amalgamating with 5 other companies, later became Containers Ltd.  In 1982, Australian Paper Mills (APM) took over the larger Containers Ltd. The new company was renamed Amcor Limited, which is today one of the world's top three global packaging companies, based on market capitalization, sales, and profits.

References

 E.K. Sinclair, "The Spreading Tree, A history of APM and Amcor 1844-1989", Allen and Unwin, 1990

Businesspeople from Melbourne
Scottish emigrants to Australia
Businesspeople from Glasgow